The Tin Pan Alley Rag is a 2009 biographical musical play produced by The Roundabout Theatre Company. The play is set in 1915 and is about Irving Berlin and Scott Joplin and their careers at the Tin Pan Alley in New York City, centered on a fictional meeting between the two composers. It was written by Mark Saltzman and directed by Stafford Arima.

In the New York version, the lead role of Irving Berlin was played by Michael Therriault and that of Scott Joplin by Michael Boatman.

Production detail
Written by: Mark Saltzman
Directed by: Stafford Arima
Music and lyrics - Irving Berlin and Scott Joplin
Original music and songs  - Brad Ellis 
Choreography - Liza Gennaro
Music direction, orchestration and arrangement - Michael Patrick Walker 
Sets - Beowulf Boritt
Costumes - Jess Goldstein
Lighting - Howell Binkley
Sound - Walter Trarbach
Associate artistic director - Scott Ellis
Presented by the Roundabout Theater Company, Todd Haimes, artistic director.

Characters
Irving Berlin, Scott Joplin, Willie, Rev. Alexander, Dorothy Goetz, Monisha, Jimmy Kelly, Mooney Mulligan, Teddy Snyder, Mr. Payton, Sophie and Freddie Alexander.

References

2009 musicals
Off-Broadway musicals